Auguste Marie Joseph Jean Léon Jaurès (3 September 185931 July 1914), commonly referred to as Jean Jaurès, was a French  Socialist leader. Initially a  Moderate Republican, he later became one of the first social democrats and (in 1902) the leader of the  French Socialist Party, which opposed Jules Guesde's revolutionary  Socialist Party of France. The two parties merged in 1905 in the French Section of the Workers' International (SFIO). An antimilitarist, Jaurès was assassinated in 1914 at the outbreak of World War I, but remains one of the main historical figures of the French Left. As a heterodox Marxist, Jaurès rejected the concept of the dictatorship of the proletariat and tried to conciliate idealism and materialism, individualism and  collectivism, democracy and class struggle, patriotism and  internationalism.

Early career
The son of an unsuccessful businessman and farmer, Jean Jaurès was born in Castres, Tarn, into a modest French provincial haut-bourgeois family. His younger brother, Louis, became an admiral and a Republican-Socialist deputy.

A brilliant student, Jaurès was educated at the Lycée Sainte-Barbe in Paris and admitted first at the École normale supérieure, in philosophy, in 1878, ahead of Henri Bergson. He obtained his agrégation of philosophy in 1881, ending up third, and then taught philosophy for two years at the Albi lycée before lecturing at the University of Toulouse. He was elected Republican deputy for the département of Tarn in 1885, sitting alongside the moderate Opportunist Republicans, opposed both to Georges Clemenceau's Radicals and to the Socialists. He then supported both Jules Ferry and Léon Gambetta.

Historian
In 1889, after unsuccessfully contesting the Castres seat, this time under the banner of Socialism, he returned to his professional duties at Toulouse, where he took an active interest in municipal affairs and helped to found the medical faculty of the university.

Jaurès became a highly influential historian of the French Revolution. His book  (1900–03) shaped interpretation from Albert Mathiez (1874–1932), Albert Soboul (1914–1982) and Georges Lefebvre (1874–1959) that came to dominate teaching analysis in class-conflict terms well into the 1980s. Jaurès emphasized the central role the middle class played in the aristocratic , as well as the emergence of the working class "" who espoused a political outlook and social philosophy that came to dominate revolutionary movements on the left.

Rise to prominence
 was initially a moderate republican, opposed to both 's Radicalism and socialism. He developed into a socialist during the late 1880s.

In 1892 the miners of  went on strike over the dismissal of their leader, . 's campaigning forced the government to intervene and require 's reinstatement. The following year, Jaurès was re-elected to the National Assembly as socialist deputy for Tarn, a seat he retained (apart from the four years 1898 to 1902) until his death.

Defeated in the legislative election of 1898, he spent four years without a legislative seat. His eloquent speeches nonetheless made him a force to be reckoned with as an intellectual champion of socialism.

SFIO leadership

In 1902, Jaurès returned as deputy for Albi. The independent socialists merged with Paul Brousse's "possibilist" (reformist) Federation of the Socialist Workers of France and Jean Allemane's Revolutionary Socialist Workers Party to form the French Socialist Party, of which Jaurès became the leader. They represented a social democratic stance, opposed to Jules Guesde's revolutionary Socialist Party of France.

In 1904, he founded the socialist paper . According to Geoffrey Kurtz, Jaures was "instrumental" in the reforms carried out by the administration, Emile Combes, "influencing the content of legislation and keeping the factions within the Bloc united." Following the Amsterdam Congress of the Second International, the French socialist groups held a Congress at Rouen in March 1905, which resulted in a new consolidation, with the merger of Jaurès's French Socialist Party and Guesde's Socialist Party of France. All the socialist movements unified the same year in the French Section of the Workers' International (SFIO).

On 1 May 1905 Jaurès visited a newly formed wine making cooperative in Maraussan. He said the peasants had to unite instead of refusing to help each other. He told them to, "in the vat of the Republic, prepare the wine of the Social Revolution!". As the revolt of the Languedoc winegrowers developed, on 11 June 1907 Jaurès filed a bill with Jules Guesde that proposed nationalization of the wine estates. After troops had shot wine growing demonstrators later that month, Parliament renewed its confidence in the government. Jaurès's  carried the headline, "The House acquits the mass killers of the Midi".

In the general elections of 1906, Jaurès was again elected for the Tarn. His ability was now generally recognized, but the strength of the SFIO still had to reckon with radical Georges Clemenceau, who was able to appeal to his countrymen (in a notable speech in the spring of 1906) to rally to a Radical programme which had no socialist ideas in view, although Clemenceau was sensitive to the conditions of the working class. Clemenceau's image as a strong and practical leader considerably diminished socialist populism. In addition to daily journalistic activity, Jaurès published ;  (1900);  (1899);  (1902), and, with other collaborators,  (1901), etc.

In 1911, he travelled to Lisbon and Buenos Aires. He supported, albeit not without criticisms, the teaching of regional languages, such as Occitan, Basque and Breton, commonly known as "patois", thus opposing, on this issue, traditional Republican Jacobinism.

Jaures opposed imperialism, arguing that it posed a threat to peace in Europe.

Anti-militarism

Jaurès was a committed antimilitarist who tried to use diplomatic means to prevent what became the First World War. In 1913, he opposed Émile Driant's Three-Year Service Law, which implemented a draft period, and tried to promote understanding between France and Germany. As conflict became imminent, he tried to organise general strikes in France and Germany in order to force the governments to back down and negotiate. This proved difficult, however, as many Frenchmen sought revenge for their country's defeat in the Franco-Prussian War and the return of the lost Alsace-Lorraine territory. Then, in May 1914, with Jaurès intending to form an alliance with Joseph Caillaux for the labour movement, the Socialists won the General Election. They planned to take office and "press for a policy of European peace". Jaurès accused French President Raymond Poincaré of being "more Russian than Russia"; whereas René Viviani complied.

In July 1914, he attended the Socialist Congress in Brussels where he struck up a constructive solidarity with German socialist party leader Hugo Haase. On the 20th of that month, Jaurès voted against a parliamentary subsidy for Poincaré's visit to St. Petersburg; which he condemned as both dangerous and provocative. The Caillaux–Jaurès alliance was dedicated to defeating military objectives aimed toward precipitating war. France sent a mission, headed by Poincaré, to coordinate French and Russian responses. Always a pacifist, Jaurès rushed back to Paris to attempt an impossible reconciliation with the government. Russia had partially mobilized, which Germany took as an extreme provocation.

Assassination

On 31 July 1914, Jaurès was assassinated. At 9 pm, he went to dine at the Café du Croissant on Rue Montmartre. Forty minutes later, Raoul Villain, a 29-year-old French nationalist, walked up to the restaurant window and fired two shots into Jaurès' back. He died five minutes later at 9:45 pm. Jaurès had been due to attend an international conference on 9 August, in an attempt to dissuade the belligerent parties from going ahead with the war. Villain also intended to murder Henriette Caillaux with his two engraved pistols. Tried after World War I and acquitted, he was later killed by the Republicans in 1936 during the Spanish Civil War.

Shock waves ran through the streets of Paris. One of the government's most charismatic and compelling orators had been assassinated. His opponent, President Poincaré, sent his sympathies to Jaurès' widow. Paris was on the brink of revolution: Jaurès had been advocating a general strike and had narrowly avoided sedition charges. One important consequence was that the cabinet postponed the arrest of socialist revolutionaries. Viviani reassured Britain of Belgian neutrality but also said that "the gloves were off".

Jaurès' murder brought matters one step closer to world war. It helped to destabilise the French government, whilst simultaneously breaking a link in the chain of international solidarity. Speaking at Jaurès' funeral a few days later, CGT leader Léon Jouhaux declared, "All working men... we take the field with the determination to drive back the aggressor." As if in reverence to his memory, the Socialists in the Chamber agreed to suspend all sabotage activity in support of the Union Sacrée. Poincaré commented that, "In the memory of man, there had never been anything more beautiful in France."

On 23 November 1924, his remains were transferred to the Panthéon.

Political legacy

Jaurès and Caillaux believed, after the latter was cleared of the murder his wife had committed, that they could expose the President's secret deal with Russia. This would have led to a policy of détente with Germany, preventing war and the inevitable carnage from 1915. Russia had covertly subsidized Poincaré's election campaign.
Poincaré had, in this theory, therefore abandoned socialism for another party and warfare. Even if Germany intentionally condemned Belgium to occupation, they had already accused Russia of starting the conflict. This theory, downplaying Germany's aggressive moves, was not widely supported in France.

In the centenary year of his assassination, politicians from all sides of the political spectrum paid tribute to him and claimed he would have supported them. François Hollande declared that "Jaurès, the man of socialism, is today the man of all of France" whilst in 2007, Nicolas Sarkozy declared that his party was Jaurès' successor.

In popular culture
 Numerous streets and plazas in France are named for Jaurès, especially in the south of France, as well as in Vienna (Austria), Ghent (Belgium), Plovdiv (Bulgaria), Tel Aviv and Haifa (Israel), Buenos Aires (Argentina) and also in Germany.
 Jaurès appears as a character in many period French films and TV series, sometimes as the main subject and sometimes as a supporting character.
 Jacques Brel wrote a song, "Jaurès", and recorded it for his last album Les Marquises. In it, he wonders why Jean Jaurès was killed, while lamenting on the life of the working class. (This song was re-interpreted by the band Zebda in 2009 as a celebration of the 150th anniversary of Jaurès's birth.)
 "Les Corons", a song by Pierre Bachelet, contains a reference to Jean Jaurès: "Y avait à la mairie le jour de la kermesse, Une photo de Jean Jaurès".
 Al Stewart's song "Trains" includes the lyrics, "on the day they buried Jean Jaurès, World War One broke free..."
 The long poem "The Mystery of the Charity of Charles Péguy" by Geoffrey Hill (1983) begins with (and returns to) the death of Jaurès.
 Metro stations have been named after Jaurès in Paris (Jaurès and Boulogne - Jean Jaurès), Toulouse (Jean-Jaurès), and Lyon (Place Jean-Jaurès).
 In the 1976 film Maîtresse ("Mistress"), a character looking at a Parisian map laments, "There are too many avenues named after Jean Jaurès."
 Transcribed as Zhores, Jaurès is a Russian first name, used by people as Zhores Alferov (Alferov has a brother named Marx) and Zhores Medvedev (whose brother is Roy, from M. N. Roy). For Zhores Medvedev, this has been disputed by Michael Lerner. See the letter by Michael Lerner in the New York Review of Books, 23 March 1972.
 Jaurès figures in Jules Romains' epic fictional work Les Hommes de Bonne Volonté.
 His assassination is depicted in Roger Martin du Gard's novel The Thibaults.
 Since 1981, a video clip of François Mitterrand placing a rose in front of Jaurès' tomb at the moment the Socialists returned to power in pomp and circumstance is often played on French television.
 In the play Hans im Schnakenloch ("Hans in the mosquito pit") by René Schickele, the character Cavrel represents Jaurès.
Jaurès is the idol and moral compass of the lead character, the union leader Michel, in the French film, The Snows of Kilimanjaro (2011). Michel quotes Jaurès throughout the film to justify and reflect on his actions.
His political journey towards democratic socialism is depicted in the 2004 made-for-TV movie "Jaurès, Birth of a Giant" (fr), . It shows him support a general strike initiated by miners in the French city of Carmaux, against the monarchist mine owner. During the course of the film, Jaurès goes from being a "Hard left Republican" allied to the likes of Jules Ferry, to calling himself a socialist. The movie ends with his successful attempt to unify the 7 socialist factions of France at the time under one party, the French Section of the Workers' International.

See also
 List of peace activists

References

Sources

Further reading 

 Bernstein, Samuel. "Jean Jaures and the Problem of War," Science & Society, vol. 4, no. 3 (Summer 1940), pp. 127–164. In JSTOR.
 
 Goldberg, Harvey. The Life of Jean Jaures. Madison, WI: University of Wisconsin Press, 1962.
 Goldberg, Harvey. "Jean Jaurès and the Jewish Question: The Evolution of a Position." Jewish Social Studies (1958): 67–94. in JSTOR
 Kurtz, Geoffrey. Jean Jaures: The Inner Life of Social Democracy. University Park, PA: Pennsylvania State University Press, 2014.
 Noland, Aaron. "Individualism in Jean Jaures' Socialist Thought." Journal of the History of Ideas (1961): 63–80. in JSTOR
 Tolosa, Benjamin T. "The Socialist Legacy of Jean Jaures and Leon Blum." Philippine Studies (1992): 226–239. in JSTOR; online
 Tuchman, Barbara W. "The Death of Jaurès", chapter 8 of The Proud Tower: A Portrait of the World before the War: 1890-1914, pp. 407 – 462, (1966).
 Weinstein, Harold. Jean Jaurès: A Study of Patriotism in the French Socialist Movement (1936)
 Williams, Stuart, ed. Socialism in France: From Jaurès to Mitterrand (Pinter, 1983)

External links

 Jean Jaurès Archive at marxists.org
 De primis socialismi germanici lineamentis apud Lutherum, Kant, Fichte, Hegel (in Latin)
 Margaret Pease, Jean Jaurès, socialist and humanitarian (New York: B. W. Huebsch, 1917) PDF/DjVu from Internet Archive
 
 

 
1859 births
1914 deaths
19th-century Latin-language writers
19th-century male writers
Anti–World War I activists
Assassinated French politicians
Burials at the Panthéon, Paris
Deaths by firearm in France
Dreyfusards
École Normale Supérieure alumni
European democratic socialists
French atheists
French Esperantists
20th-century French historians
French humanists
French male writers
French Marxists
French newspaper founders
French pacifists
French Section of the Workers' International politicians
French Socialist Party (1902) politicians
Historians of the French Revolution
Latin-language writers from France
Lycée Louis-le-Grand alumni
Members of the 4th Chamber of Deputies of the French Third Republic
Members of the 5th Chamber of Deputies of the French Third Republic
Members of the 6th Chamber of Deputies of the French Third Republic
Members of the 8th Chamber of Deputies of the French Third Republic
Members of the 9th Chamber of Deputies of the French Third Republic
Members of the 10th Chamber of Deputies of the French Third Republic
Members of the 11th Chamber of Deputies of the French Third Republic
Non-interventionism
People from Castres
People murdered in Paris
Politicians from Occitania (administrative region)
Academic staff of the University of Toulouse
19th-century French historians
1914 murders in France
1910s murders in Paris